Rubroxena is a genus of moths belonging to the subfamily Tortricinae of the family Tortricidae. It consists of only one species, Rubroxena rubra, which is found in Ecuador (Azuay Province).

The wingspan is about 14 mm. The ground colour of the forewings is reddish rust, preserved mostly along the termen, costa and along the anal veins and dorsal arm of the median cell. The hindwings are orange, but brown on the periphery and along some veins.

Etymology
The generic name refers to the coloration and is derived from Latin ruber (meaning red) and the name of the related genus Chrysoxena. The specific name refers to red colouration of the forewings and is derived from Latin rubra (meaning red).

See also
List of Tortricidae genera

References

Euliini
Tortricidae genera